A data source may refer to:

 Database
 Datasource, a special name for the connection set up to a database from a server in the Java software platform
 Computer file
 Data stream